The Embassy of Moldova in Athens is the diplomatic mission of Moldova to Greece. which also functions as the non-resident embassy of Moldova to Cyprus.

See also  
 Greece–Moldova relations
 List of diplomatic missions of Moldova 
 Ministry of the Foreign Affairs and European Integration of Moldova

References

External links 
 Ambasada Republicii Moldova în Republica Elenă

Athens
Moldova
Greece–Moldova relations